Don Williams Volume One is the first LP album by American country singer Don Williams. Released in 1973 on the JMI Records label, the album reached number five on the US Country Albums Chart. It was re-issued in 1974 on the ABC DOT label and subsequently in 1980 on the MCA label. "The Shelter of Your Eyes" and "Come Early Morning" were released as singles in 1973.

Background 
From 1964 to 1971, Don Williams formed and played with the band the Pozo-Seco Singers. In 1966, the band signed with Columbia Records, due to the strength of their first single, "Time". Williams left the band in 1971, and moved to Nashville, where he met producer and writer Allen Reynolds, who introduced Williams to country singer and businessman Jack Clement, who had just founded JMI Records. Williams was soon signed to JMI records, and Reynolds would go on to produce and write on Williams' next two albums.

Initially a songwriters demo was recorded to sell Williams' songs to other artists. However, when there wasn't a strong initial response, it was decided to record and release a full-length album.

Content 
At the time the album was released, the Nashville sound featured more elaborate orchestral arrangements; however Don Williams Volume One caught on.

In addition to producing the album, Reynolds contributed the song "I Recall a Gypsy Woman" written along with Bob McDill and Williams. While not initially released as a single in 1973, the song would be released as the B-side from the Don Williams Volume Two album single "Atta Way Go", and as a single in the UK in 1976, where it become a minor hit.

Bob McDill had a hand in writing three of the album's songs, including the final song on the album, "Amanda", which was also included as the B-side on his No. 12 hit "Come Early Morning." Williams' version reached No. 33 on the Billboard Hot Country Singles chart.

When Williams died in 2017, his version of "Amanda" was singled out in his Rolling Stone obituary:“In giving voice to songs like ‘Good Ole Boys Like Me,’ ‘Lord, I Hope This Day Is Good’ and ‘Amanda,’ Don Williams offered calm, beauty, and a sense of wistful peace that is in short supply these days,” Country Music Hall of Fame and Museum CEO Kyle Young said in a statement Friday. “His music will forever be a balm in troublesome times. Everyone who makes country music with grace, intelligence, and ageless intent will do so while standing on the shoulders of this gentle giant.”The masters for both "Come Early Morning" and "Amanda," along with Williams' other recordings for JMI Records, were sold to ABC-Dot Records in 1974.

Track listing 
From the original vinyl:

Side A

 "Come Early Morning" (Bob McDill) - 3:08
 "Too Late To Turn Back Now" (Don Williams, Allen Reynolds) - 2:03
 "Endless Sleep" (Jody Reynolds, Dolores Nance) - 2:11
 "The Shelter of Your Eyes" (Don Williams) - 2:58
 "I Recall a Gypsy Woman" (Allen Reynolds, Bob McDill) - 3:20

Side B

 "No Use Running" - 2:38
 "How Much Time Does It Take" (Don Williams) - 2:32
 "My Woman's Love" (Don Williams) - 3:13
 "Don't You Believe" (Don Williams) - 2:39
 "Amanda" (Bob McDill) - 3:08

Personnel
From the album liner notes:
 Don Williams - lead vocals, rhythm guitar
 Joe Allen - bass
 Kenny Malone - drums
 Jimmy Colvard, Reggie Young - electric guitar
 Buddy Spicher - fiddle
 Chuck Cochran - organ
 Bobby Wood, Chuck Cochran - piano
 Chip Young, Jimmy Colvard - rhythm guitar
 Lloyd Green - steel guitar
 Don Sheffield - trumpet
 The Joyful Noise - backing vocals
 Danny Flowers - harmonica

Production 

 Produced by Allen Reynolds
 Violin Arrangements by Chuck Cochran

References 

Don Williams albums
1973 debut albums
Albums produced by Allen Reynolds